Sarv-e Jahan (also Romanized as Sarv-e Jahān and Sarvajahān; also known as Sarvandzhakhan) is a village in Sain Qaleh Rural District, in the Central District of Abhar County, Zanjan Province, Iran. At the 2006 census, its population was 436, in 92 families.

References 

Populated places in Abhar County